Jorge Tacla is a Chilean-born visual artist. He studied at the Escuela de Bellas Artes, Universidad de Chile in Santiago and moved to New York City in 1981.

Well known for his paintings and drawings, he also works with other medias such as photography, video, performance and installation. Tacla works between New York and Santiago, Chile.

In 2019 the Smithsonian's Archives of American Art incorporated Jorge Tacla's papers into their archive. This papers include some of his drawings, correspondence, photographs, notebooks, and clippings.

Biography 

Tacla was born in 1958 in Santiago, Chile. Tacla received music studies in piano and percussion during his childhood.

In 1981 he moved to New York. Besides his artistic production, Tacla is also the co-founder and artistic director of a production company, was co-founder and adjunct artistic director of the Santiago International Film Festival (2006-2013) and was director of the film department at CORPARTES (2005-2013).

Exhibitions 
Jorge Tacla's work has been exhibited at  MoMa PS1, NY; Seibu Artforum, Tokyo; Museum of Contemporary Hispanic Art, NY; National Museum of Contemporary Art, Seoul; High Museum of Art, Atlanta; Dublin Contemporary 2011, Dublin; 798 Biennale, Beijing; The Bronx Museum, NY, Milwaukee Art Museum, MI, Museo Nacional de Bellas Artes, Santiago; Sharjah Biennale 10, Sharjah; 55 Venice Biennale, Venice; Museo de la Memoria y los Derechos Humanos, Santiago; Art Museum of the Americas, Washington DC.; California Center for the Arts, CA; MALBA, Buenos Aires.

Selected Public Commissions 
 2010 Museo de la Memoria, “Al Mismo Tiempo, en el Mismo Lugar,” Santiago, Chile
 2004 Edificio el Regidor, “San Santiago,” Santiago, Chile
 1990 Bronx Housing Court, “Memories of the Bronx,” Percent for Art Commission, Bronx, NY

Awards 
 2013    Rockefeller Foundation Bellagio Center in Bellagio, Italy
 1992    Eco Art Award, Brazil
 1991    New York Foundation for the Arts, USA 
 1987    New York Foundation for the Arts, USA 
 1988    John Simon Guggenheim Memorial Foundation Fellowship, USA 
 1986    AT&T Foundation, USA 
 1981–82 Grant “Corporación Amigos del Arte” Santiago, Chile

General references 
 San Martin, Florencia (2021). The Jorge Tacla Archives. Santiago: Ediciones de Arrabal.
 Yau, John; Pietropaolo, Francesca; Zamudio, Raúl; Vine, Richard; Cameron, Dan; Kuspit, Donald; Viveros-Fauné, Christian; San Martín, Florencia (2017). Jorge Tacla: Señal de Abandono. Santiago: Metales Pesados. 
 Eltit, Diamela; Viveros-Fauné, Christian (2017). Jorge Tacla: Todo lo sólido se desvanece. Santiago: CORPARTES. 
 
 
 
 Rubey, Dan (1992). Jorge Tacla: Memory of Place. Exh. cat. New York: Lehman College Art Gallery.
 Kuspit, Donald; Przybilla, Carrie; Ruzicka, Joseph (1997). Jorge Tacla: Drawings. Exh. cat. Milwaukee: Milwaukee Art Museum

References

External links 
 Official Website
 Smithsonian Archives of American Art

Living people
1958 births
Chilean painters
Chilean artists